Marek Minda (14 February 1950 – 13 August 2021) was a Polish doctor and politician who served as a Senator.

References

1950 births
2021 deaths
Polish physicians
Polish politicians
Members of the Senate of Poland 1993–1997
Labour Union (Poland) politicians
People from Łomża